Kendujhar District, is an administrative district of Odisha. The district is one of the fifth Scheduled Areas of Odisha. The town of Kendujhar (or Kendujhargarh) is the district headquarters. The district has three sub-divisions, Anandapur, Champua, and Kendujhar.

Etymology 
Origin of the name Keonjhar/Kendujhar is not certain. In the locals pronounce the name as Kenjhar. In medieval Sanskrit inscriptions the name is "Kenjhar" is found. The name has been Sanskritised to Kendujhar by the ex-Durbar government. The name Kendujhar is derived from "Kendu" meaning East Indian Ebony (tree which is abundant in the district) and "Jhar" meaning water spring.

History 

Early history of Kendujhar is not certain. Nagas of Vindhyatabi ruled keonjhar during the second century CE to fourth century CE and Satrubhanja was famous king of the dynasty. In Sitabhinji, fresco paintings were found in the cave shelter of Ravana Chhaya, which date to the fifth century A.D.
 
Written references about Kendujhar come about early 1100s. Some of the documents refer to Upper Kendujhar and Mayurbhanj together forming a state called Hariharpur. A separate existence of Keonjhar came into being at about 1128 C.E. The founding of the kingdom is credited to Jati Bhanj (Jyoti Bhanj). There were several chiefs of this Gadjat State until Raja Janardan Bhanja signed a treaty with East India Company. This recognised the title of Raja by British Government. There was a succession dispute when the then Raja died without a legitimate heir in 1861. This dispute was finally over with a multiparty compromise with Dhanurjaya Bhanja being crowned king in 1868. However, there was a rebellion that broke out soon after led by Ratna Naik and a few other tribals. This rebellion was quelled with the help of British Police. There was another tribal uprising in 1891 under the leadership of Dharanidhar Naik against oppressive practices such as bonded labour. This was known as "Dharani Meli". The Raja had to flee to Cuttack and the rebellion was again quelled by British forces.

Post Indian Independence in 1947 the whole of Keonjhar State was integrated into the State of Odisha (then Orissa) by "The Administration of Orissa States Orders, 1948". It became one of the 13 districts of the State.

Geography
Keonjhar is a landlocked district situated in the northern part of Orissa. It is bounded by Mayurbhanj District, Balasore District and Bhadrak District to the east, Jajpur District to the south, Dhenkanal District, Anugul District and Sundargarh District to the west, and West Singhbhum district to the north.

The district of Keonjhar is highly rich in mineral resources and has vast deposits of iron, manganese and chromium ores. About 30% of the district's total area is covered with tracts of dense forests. Keonjhar also contains one of the oldest rock formations in the world, which covers an area of 100 km2.

Topography
On the eastern half of the district are the plains of Anandapur. To the west is a range of hills containing peaks such as Gandhamardan (3477 ft), Mankadnacha (3639 ft), Gonasika (3219 ft) and Thakurani (3003 ft)

About half of the area of this district is covered by forests of Northern tropical deciduous type trees which include Sal, Asan, Jamu, Arjuna, Kusum, Kangada, Mahua, Mango, Kendu.

The highlands consist of clusters of rugged crags and the mountaintops appear to be sharply ridged or peaked, however they have extensive tablelands on their summits. In some areas, isolated hills rise abruptly from the plains, but most areas have a general elevation of over 600m. The highlands form the watershed for a number of rivers, including the Baitarani River.

Nomira national geological monument

Pillow Lava in lron ore belt at Nomira 2 km east of Nomira 18 km from 18 km south of Joda town, on the Keonjhar-Barbil-Lahunipada state highway, has been declared the National Geological Monuments of India by the Geological Survey of India (GSI), for their protection, maintenance, promotion and enhancement of geotourism. Pillow Lava, Iron ore belt of Nomira is an exposure of ellipsoidal pillow lava of a maximum thickness of 2m x 0.6m. The fine to medium grained, green to bluish green coloured with abundant Vesicular texture filled with quartz. The lavas and the associated pyroclastic rocks and tuffs are underlain by quartzite and overlain by shale, chart-shale and banded hematite jasper.

The site can be reached from Joda by following Joda Nayagar road up to Bamebari and then following a 2 km unmetalled road leading eastward up to Nomira.

Climate
The temperature in the district begins to rise rapidly in the spring with the highest temperatures recorded in the month of May usually go up to 38 °C. The maximum recorded temperature however is 43.3 °C. The weather cools during the monsoon in June and remains cool until the end of October. The temperature in the month of December can drop down to 7 °C. The minimum temperature recorded was 1 °C. The average annual rainfall is 1910.1 mm.

Economy

Keonjhar is part of the Singhbhum-Keonjhar-Banei iron belt. This belt stretches about 50 km and around 14.5 km lie within Kendujhar District. Daitari hills that border Kendujhar and Jajpur district is home to high grade of Iron ore. Odisha Mining Corporation along with TISCO and Bolani Mines Private Ltd run iron ore mines in Kendujhar. In addition there are many medium and small scale mining operations in Barbil/Joda area. Keonjhar also has abundant manganese and Chromite deposits. Kendujhar supplies around 80% of Odisha's manganese production. The manganese mines are at Banspani, Barbil and Barjamda while the Chromite mines are at Baula, Nuasahi and Phulinjhorhuli.

2006 the Ministry of Panchayati Raj named Kendujhar one of the country's 250 most backward districts. The district is one of the 19 districts in Orissa currently receiving funds from the Backward Regions Grant Fund Programme (BRGF).

As per the Mines and Minerals (Development & Regulation) Act of 2015 the district is set to receive aid from mining companies and lease holders.

Divisions
Subdivisions- 03, 1. Anandapur, 2. Champua, 3. Kendujhar (sadar)
Tehsils- 13
Blocks- 13: Anandapur, Banspal, Champua, Ghasipura, Ghatgaon, Harichandanpur, Hatadihi, Jhumpura, Joda, Keonjhar, Patna, Saharpada, Telkoi
Revenue Circles- 50
Gram Panchayats- 287
Sub-Registrar Office- 06
Police Stations- 25
Towns(Urban Areas)- 09
Municipalities- 04: 1. Anandapur, 2. Barbil, 3. Kendujhar, 4. Joda
NAC- 01 Champua
Census Town- 04: 1.Bolani, 2.Jajanga, 3.Jhumpura, 4.Daitari
Inhabited Villages- 2135
Fire Stations- 13
 District Jail/ Special Jail- 01
Sub-Jails- 02
Agricultural Districts- 03
ICDS Projects- 14
Treasury/SubTreasury- 07
HQ.Hospital/Hospitals- 04
Community Health Centre/UGPHC- 17
Public Health Centre- 81
Sub Centre (Health)- 351

Demographics

According to the 2011 census, Kendujhar district has a population of 1,801,733. It is the 264th most populous district in India. The district's population growth rate over the decade 2001–2011 was 15.42%. Kendujhar has a sex ratio of 987 females for every 1000 males, and a literacy rate of 69%.

The Scheduled Tribes of the district constitute 45.45% of the total population whereas the Scheduled Castes constitute 11.62%. The concentration of Scheduled Tribes is the highest in the Keonjhar subdivision and lowest in the Anandapur subdivision. The majority of Scheduled Tribes members are employed in agriculture, mining, or quarrying. The literacy among the Scheduled Tribes was 15.25% in the 1981 census but it has increased to 24.89% in the 1991 census. This percentage is higher than the State average of 22.31%.

Major Tribes
There are approximately 55 tribal communities in the district. The largest group are the Hos. The other major tribes are the Munda, Bhuiya, Gond, Bathudi, Sounti, Santal, Juang, Shabar and Bhumij. These nine tribes constituted almost 95% of the total tribal population of the district.

Languages

At the time of the 2011 Census of India, 78.88% of the population in the district spoke Odia, 8.09% Ho, 3.77% Munda, 2.66% Hindi, 1.69% Juang and 0.47% Santali as their first language.

Around 30% of the tribals belong to the Ho people and they speak the Ho language. Other languages include Bhunjia, which is spoken by approximately 7000 Bhunjia Adivasis. Only Bhunija Tribal communities also speak Odia as a secondary language and other tribal communities uses their own mother tongues.

Culture and Heritage of Keonjhar
The culture of Keonjhar district is mainly tribal culture of different tribes residing in this district. The district administration recognised important tribal festivals among which are the festivals of Sohrai, Gaumara Parab, Sarhul, Mage Parab, Baa Parab, Hermuutu, Heroh Parab, Karam Parab, Jomnama Parab,Jomsuim, Uda Parab, and Baruni Jatra.

Folk Dance of Keonjhar
The district has large sections of tribal communities. So, there are many folk dances such as Ho, Juang and Changu dances which are popular and recognised by the district administration.

Ho Dance
This dance is performed by the Ho speaking tribe mainly during Mage Porob in the month of November–January.

Juang Dance
Juang dance is performed by the Juang tribe of this district.

Politics

Vidhan sabha constituencies

The following is the 6 Vidhan sabha constituencies of Kendujhar district and the elected members of that area.

Gallery

References

External links

indiatravelite.com
gis.ori.nic.in

 
1948 establishments in India
Districts of Odisha